Lanthanum oxalate is an inorganic compound, a salt of lanthanum metal and oxalic acid with the chemical formula .

Synthesis
Reaction of soluble lanthanum nitrate with an excess of oxalic acid:

2La(NO3)3 + 3(COOH)2 -> La2(C2O4)3 + 6HNO3

Also, a reaction of lanthanum chloride with oxalic acid:
2LaCl3 + 3H2C2O4 -> La2(C2O4)3 + 6HCl

Physical properties
Lanthanum(III) oxalate forms colorless crystals that are poorly soluble in water.

The compound forms various crystallohydrates •n, where n = 1, 2, 3, 7, and 10.

The crystallohydrates decompose when heated.

References

Inorganic compounds
Oxalates